Ença Fati (born 11 August 1993) is a Bissau-Guinean professional footballer who plays for Portuguese club C.D. Mafra as a winger.

Club career
Born in Bissau, Guinea-Bissau, Fati moved to Portugal as a child, and started playing futsal. He made his association football debut in 2011, going on to spend two years in the Spanish regional divisions. 

Fati returned to Portugal in the 2013 off-season, signing with amateurs Real SC. In February 2015 he moved straight to the Primeira Liga, joining Moreirense FC. He played his first game in the competition on 3 May, coming on as a 70th-minute substitute in a 3–1 away loss against Boavista FC. His first goal came 1 November 2015, when he closed the 1–1 draw at Associação Académica de Coimbra in injury time.

After two loans in the LigaPro, Fati left the Parque de Jogos Comendador Joaquim de Almeida Freitas in summer 2018, going on to continue his career in that tier with U.D. Oliveirense, C.D. Feirense, Casa Pia AC, U.D. Vilafranquense and C.D. Mafra.

Personal life
Fati was cousin to another footballer, Ansu Fati. Developed at FC Barcelona, he played internationally for Spain.

Honours
Moreirense
Taça da Liga: 2016–17

References

External links

Portuguese League profile 

1993 births
Living people
Bissau-Guinean emigrants to Portugal
Sportspeople from Bissau
Bissau-Guinean footballers
Portuguese footballers
Association football wingers
Divisiones Regionales de Fútbol players
Primeira Liga players
Liga Portugal 2 players
Real S.C. players
Moreirense F.C. players
Leixões S.C. players
U.D. Oliveirense players
C.D. Feirense players
Casa Pia A.C. players
U.D. Vilafranquense players
C.D. Mafra players
Bissau-Guinean expatriate footballers
Expatriate footballers in Spain
Expatriate footballers in Portugal
Bissau-Guinean expatriate sportspeople in Spain
Bissau-Guinean expatriate sportspeople in Portugal